My Dog Dou Dou,  is a 2012 Singaporean drama comedy film directed by Ng Say Yong.

Plot
A boy, Xing, takes a stray dog home one day. His pet hating father Meng initially disapproves of this, until he realises that the dog can predict lottery numbers.

Cast
 Ivan Lo Kai Jun as Xing
 Wang Shih-hsien as Meng
 Henry Thia
 Liu Ling Ling
 Cathryn Lee
 Alvin Wong
 Tommy Kuan

Release
The film released in theatres on 20 September 2012.

Reception
Lin Mingwen of My Paper rated the film three stars out of five. Li Yiyun of Lianhe Zaobao rated the film three stars out of five for entertainment and two-and-a-half stars for art. Yip Wai Yee of The Straits Times rated the film two stars out of five, criticising the inconsistent tone and unnecessary plot points.

References

External links
 

2012 films
2012 comedy-drama films
Singaporean comedy-drama films